Misamis Oriental–Maria Cristina Boundary Road is a , primary road in Iligan. It is a component of National Route 9 (N9) and National Route 77 (N77).

History

Route description

Misamis Oriental Boundary 
The road starts after the boundary between Iligan and Lugait. It starts as N9 after the end of Butuan–Cagayan de Oro–Iligan Road.

Overton to Iligan-Balo-i 
N9 transfers to Overton–Buru-un Road. The road’s route continues as N77. The road ends in the boundary of Iligan and Balo-i and is now called Iligan–Marawi Road (N77).

References 

Roads in Lanao del Norte